Kathāra is a village panchayat located in the Darbhanga district, Bihar state, India.

References 

Villages in Darbhanga district